Panipat is a 2019 Indian Hindi-language epic war drama film directed by Ashutosh Gowarikar. Starring Arjun Kapoor, Sanjay Dutt and Kriti Sanon, it depicts the events that took place during the Third Battle of Panipat. The film was theatrically released in India on 6 December 2019. The film was a box office failure.

Plot

By 1758, the Maratha Empire had reached its peak under the leadership of Peshwa Balaji Baji Rao aka Nana Saheb. Maratha commanders Raghunath Rao, the Peshwa's brother, Shamsher Bahadur, the Peshwa's half-brother, and Sadashiv Rao Bhau, the Peshwa's cousin, defeat the Nizam of Hyderabad and capture their commander of artillery Ibrahim Khan Gardi, with Sadashiv inducting him into the Maratha Army as their commander of artillery. They return home to the Empire's capital at Pune and are welcomed.  Due to pressure by his wife Gopika Bai, the Peshwa appoints Sadashiv as the Empire's finance minister in favour of the Peshwa's son Vishwas Rao, which he reluctantly accepts.

Sadashiv lists the defaulters who failed to pay taxes to the Maratha Empire on time, and notes that the Rohilla's Head Najib ad-Dawlah has the largest amount of tax due. Najib, determined to teach the Marathas a lesson, allies himself with Ahmad Shah Abdali, inviting him to Delhi. News of this formidable alliance reaches Pune, along with the news of Dattaji Shinde's death in battle against Najib. The Peshwa appoints Raghunath Rao as the commander of the Maratha forces which will be dispatched to fight Abdali and defend Delhi. However, Raghunath asks for a large amount of money, which Sadashiv denies, citing the treasury's condition after consecutive battles. Raghunath, therefore, refuses to march north, which leads the Peshwa to appoint Sadashiv as the commander-in-chief of the Maratha army, under the overlordship of Vishwas Rao, the Peshwa's son and heir. The army, along with a large number of non-combatants (women, children and pilgrims), begin their long and arduous journey north.

They arrive at Dholpur, where they're welcomed by their fellow Maratha generals— Govind Pant Bundela, Balwant Rao Mehendale, Jankoji Shinde, and the veteran Malhar Rao Holkar. They start making alliances with other kingdoms, including Maharaja Suraj Mal and Nawab Shuja-ud-Daulah, and are successful, with their army size growing to 50,000 men. Abdali is also making alliances, taking advantage of the Rajput kings' hatred for the Marathas. Sadashiv and the commanders receive intelligence that Abdali has camped on the other side of the Yamuna and spot Shuja's flags along with Abdali's, revealing that the Nawab had switched allegiance. Due to the heavy rains, the Marathas are unable to build a bridge to cross the Yamuna. Sadashiv decides to march north and capture Delhi and then cross the Yamuna to defeat Abdali.

Najib receives intelligence that the Marathas have retreated, from which Abdali deduces that they are marching north to Delhi. He suggests that they also march north and cross the Yamuna. Meanwhile, the Marathas defeat Najib's general and capture Delhi. After finding out the Afghans are chasing the Marathas, Sadashiv decides to strategically capture Kunjpura Fort and eventually carry out a massacre there of helpless Afghans departed from their main column, which angers Abdali to such an extent that he immediately reacts by crossing the swollen Yamuna in heavy rainfall. This leaves the Maharaja of Patiala, Ala Singh, unable to send his soldiers. Food begins to dwindle, and the Maratha soldiers and civilians are forced to go without food. Although the arrival of King Aradhak Singh provides some relief to the Maratha camp, but soon after camping at Panipat, Abdali catches up with the Marathas and comes face to face. However, after hearing of a possible coup d'état at his capital in Kandahar, Abdali arranges for a truce with Sadashiv but scraps it after the latter disagrees to Abdali's terms. After both sides decide on strategies and formations, they prepare for the final confrontation.

Parvati Bai and the civilians and pilgrims stay at a small camp towards the back, and Vishwas promises Sadashiv that he'll never get off his elephant during the battle for his own protection. Artillery firing begins by both sides, with substantial damage done to Abdali's army due to Ibrahim Khan's leadership. The riflemen also start attacking. The infantry then begins the main attack, with the Marathas doing well. Overcome with fear, many soldiers of Abdali's army retreat, but Abdali threatens them with severe punishment and forces them to return to the battle. Meanwhile, on seeing Shamsher wounded, Vishwas descends from his elephant to protect him. Sadashiv fends off the Afghans who attacked the young prince, but a bullet hits Vishwas on his head, killing him. This is a huge blow to the morale of the Marathas, who begin to lose ground from then. One by one, the Maratha chieftains are either wounded or killed. Araadhak Singh unexpectedly retreats from the battle. It is then revealed that he was angry with the Marathas for the high taxes imposed upon them, so he secretly allied himself with Abdali and passed the information onto him. Seeing the tide of the battle turn, Malhar Rao retreats from the battlefield and escorts the non-combatants to safety, as promised to Sadashiv on the eve of the battle. Abdali's soldiers close in on Sadashiv but he bravely fights back, sustaining serious injuries. He eventually succumbs to his wounds and dies, but not before making Abdali aware of his pyrrhic victory.

Back in Pune, Parvati Bai dies from grief. Abdali sends the Peshwa a letter, praising Sadashiv's bravery and courage. The epilogue reveals that even though victorious, Abdali never returned to India. Under the leadership of Peshwa Madhav Rao, the generals Mahadaji Shinde and Tukoji Rao Holkar saved the Maratha empire from extinction, and re-captured Delhi ten years later, making the Marathas a dominant force once again.

Cast

Arjun Kapoor as Sadashiv Rao Bhau
Sanjay Dutt as Ahmad Shah Abdali
Kriti Sanon as Parvati Bai
Mantra as Najib-Ud-Daula
Mohnish Bahl as Nana Saheb Peshwa
Padmini Kolhapure as Gopika Bai (Peshwinbai)
Sahil Salathia as Shamsher Bahadur
Kunal Kapoor as Shuja-ud-Daula
Fahim Fazli as Shah Barakzai
Mir Sarwar as Imad-ul-Mulk
Milind Gunaji as Dattaji Rao Scindia
Abhishek Nigam as Vishwas Rao Peshwa
Ravindra Mahajani as SardarMalhar Rao Holkar
Gashmeer Mahajani as Sardar Jankoji Shinde
Nawab Shah as Ibrahim Khan Gardi
Kashyap Parulekar as Raghunath Rao
Suhasini Mulay as Radhabai, Sadashiv Rao Bhau's Grandmother 
S. M. Zaheer as Mughal Emperor Alamgir II
Arun Bali as Ala Singh
Manoj Bakshi as King Suraj Mal
Paresh Shukla as Govind Pant Bundela
Zeenat Aman as Sakina Begum
Pradeep Patvardhan as Lingoji Narayan
Krutika Deo as Radhikabai, Vishwasrao's wife
Vinita Mahesh as Mehrambai, Shamsher Bahadur's wife
Archana Nipankar as Anandibai, Raghunath Rao's wife
Shailesh Datar as Pant
Dyanesh Wadkar as Sardar Balwantrao Mehendale
Shyam Mashalkar as Bhanu
Dushyant Wagh as Nana Phadnavis
Sanjay Khapre as Mahadji Scindia
Rajesh Ahir as Sardar Biniwale
Sagar Talashilkar as Sardar Raste
Ajit Shidhaye as Shahwali Khan, wazir and commander in chief to Ahmed Shah Abdali)
Ashutosh Gowariker as Narrator (Climax)

Production

Development
Art Director Nitin Chandrakant Desai recreated Shaniwar Wada at ND Studios, Karjat. Neeta Lulla designed the costumes. Padmini Kolhapure joined the cast in October 2018 as Gopika Bai. In June 2019, Zeenat Aman joined the cast to portray Sakina Begum.

Filming
On 30 November 2018, Gowariker and the cast tweeted a promotional poster to announce the beginning of principal photography. On 30 June 2019, Sanon wrapped up the shoot by posting pictures and notes for Gowariker and Kapoor.

Soundtrack

Ajay–Atul were the composers of the music for the film. The songs were written by Javed Akhtar.

Release and reception
The film was released on 6 December 2019 in theatres and on 14 February 2020 on Netflix.

Critical reception 
The film received mixed reviews from critics. On Rotten Tomatoes, the film scored  by critics. Monika Rawal Kukreja of Hindustan Times wrote "Panipat is an honest attempt at recreating the war that we only read in history books until now. It’s a tribute to the Maratha community in its truest form and even it was shorter by an hour, it could have had the same impact".
The Times of India gave 3.5 out of 5 stars stating "Panipat delves into a significant chapter in history and is a war drama that lauds the unshakable bravery, courage and the strong principles of the Maratha's".
India Today gave 2.5 out of 5 stars stating "Ashutosh Gowariker may not be able to do grandeur like Sanjay Leela Bhansali, but he can do war. Yet, a lacklustre cinematography and terrible CGI mars this solid attempt. It would have worked 10 years ago".

Namrata Joshi of The Hindu wrote "Gowariker may have taken liberties with history, but doesn’t play around with the form. He sticks to the tried and tested, the long and langourous and old-fashioned". Bollywood Hungama gave 3 out of 5 stars stating "Panipat throws light on an important chapter of Indian history with the battle scenes as its USP". Zee News gave 3 out of 5 stars stating "The film is a great effort by Gowariker and deserves to be watched for some impeccable performances and adrenaline-pumping action".

News18 gave 2.5 out of 5 stars stating "Panipat, a film about Maratha warrior Sadashiv Rao Bhau who staves off Afghan ruler Ahmad Shah Abdali, disappoints only because of a linear screenplay that fails to rouse dramatic emotions so important to historicals". NDTV gave 2 out of 5 stars stating "The burden on Arjun Kapoor is too heavy for him though he rises manfully to the challenge. Panipat definitely isn't Mohenjo Daro. But is that saying much? It will take three hours of your life and a whole lot of patience to sit through this laboured film". Deccan Chronicle gave 2.5 out of 5 stars stating "Directors like Gowariker do no service to the nation or their audience by twisting the truth, ignoring military, diplomatic, common sense follies and rewriting history with jingoistic fervour".

BBC News and Al Jazeera reported that the film received criticism from different parts of the world, especially from Afghanistan since Ahmad Shah Abdali is the national hero and the founder of modern day Afghanistan. Afghan viewers pointed that the film's portrayal of Abdali was that of an Arab, rather than an Afghan. Critics linked the rising number of Bollywood films with negative Muslim characters, such as the portrayal of Alauddin Khilji as a cruel and vicious ruler in the film Padmaavat (2018), as an attempt by the industry executives to align with India's ruling Bharatiya Janata Party, a Hindu nationalist party led by Prime Minister Narendra Modi.

The Panipat trailer depicted Ahmed Shah Durrani as a ruthless and brutal ruler and Afghans as 'battle-hardened, blood-thirsty savages'. While the film presented Marathas as "sophisticated and righteous". Consul General of Afghanistan in Mumbai, Naseem Sharifi, said that 'Afghans would not tolerate any insult to Ahmad Shah Durrani'. Afghan journalists stated that the film will create more Islamophobia and racism towards Afghans. The Telegraph India reported that films like Padmaavat (2018), Kesari (2019) and Panipat have stereotyped and vilified Afghans as brutal, cold-blooded and treacherous. Afghanistan's Ambassador to India, Tahir Qadiri, claimed that he was in contact with Indian officials and have shared the Afghan concerns with them. Ajmal Alamzai, the cultural attache at the Afghan embassy in New Delhi, claimed that he had made several unsuccessful attempts to contact the director of the film. Pajhwok Afghan News reported that the Panipat film trailer depicted the Maratha Empire as victorious in the Third Battle of Panipat despite the fact that it was Ahmad Shah Durrani, who had won the battle. Khaama Press, another Afghan newspaper, reported that some Afghan social media users have welcomed the film as reality while others criticised it and claimed that parts of history have been forged in favour of specific groups.

Box office 
Panipats opening day domestic collection was 4.12 crore. On the second day, the film collected ₹5.78 crore. On the third day, the film collected ₹7.78 crore, taking the total opening weekend collection to ₹17.68 crore.

, with a gross of 40.81 crore in India and 8.48 crore overseas, the film has a worldwide gross collection of 49.29 crore.

See also
 List of Asian historical drama films

References

External links
 
 Panipat on Bollywood Hungama
 

2010s Hindi-language films
2010s historical drama films
2019 war drama films
2010s action war films
2019 films
Films set in Afghanistan
Films set in 1758
Films set in the 1760s
Films set in the Maratha Empire
Indian action drama films
Indian action war films
Indian historical drama films
Indian war drama films
Reliance Entertainment films
2019 action drama films